Lukas Hradecky (born 24 November 1989) is a Finnish footballer who plays as a goalkeeper for Bundesliga club Bayer Leverkusen and the Finland national team.

Born in Bratislava, present-day Slovakia, Hradecky was raised in the Finnish city of Turku from the age of one. He began his senior club career playing for TPS, before signing with Esbjerg fB at age 19 in 2009. After winning his first trophy, the Danish 1st Division, during his third season in Denmark, he helped Esbjerg win the Danish Cup in 2013. Hradecky was named Finnish Footballer of the Year by the Football Association of Finland three years in a row between 2016 and 2018.

Formerly an international at under-17, under-18, under-19, under-20 and under-21 levels, Hradecky made his debut for Finland in May 2010 at the age of 20. He appeared in nine out of ten of Finland's UEFA Euro 2020 qualification matches and helped the national team secure its first ever appearance at the UEFA European Championship.

Club career

TPS
Hradecky began his career in Turun Palloseura, a club in Turku, where he grew up. In 2008, he played in the International Karel Stegeman U-19 Youth Tournament in Ruurlo, Netherlands, where he won the prize for best goalkeeper.

Esbjerg
On 10 January 2009, Hradecky transferred to Esbjerg fB and signed a four-year contract with the five-time Danish champions. On 3 August 2010 it was announced that Hradecky had been called to be tested for a week by Manchester United to strengthen their goalkeeping department after the departure of Tom Heaton. However, he chose to seek the chance to be the primary keeper in Esbjerg instead.
After the 2012–13 Superliga season Hradecky's contract with Esbjerg fB expired, and an agreement to prolong the contract was not reached.

Brøndby
On 12 June 2013, Hradecky joined Danish Superliga club Brøndby IF on a four-year contract on a free transfer. On 21 June 2013 Hradecky made his debut in the Superliga in a match against Vestsjælland.

Eintracht Frankfurt
In August 2015 Hradecky transferred from Brøndby to German Bundesliga team Eintracht Frankfurt. The value of the transfer was never published, but according to newspapers Eintracht paid €2.5 million to Brøndby. In 2017–18, Hradecky's last season with Eintracht, he was voted Bundesliga Goalkeeper of the Season.

Bayer Leverkusen

In May 2018, Bayer Leverkusen announced the signing of Hradecky for the 2018–19 season on a free transfer. He agreed a contract until 2023.
 Hradecky made his debut in Leverkusen on 15 September 2018 in a match against Bayern Munich. On 6 August 2022, Hradecky was sent off during Leverkusen's defeat against Borussia Dortmund for handball after reaching out to grab the ball in front of his box.

International career

Finland youth teams

Hradecky earned several caps for Finland on different junior levels. He made his junior level national team debut when he was 16 years old on 16 November 2006 in Athens in a match against Greece. He was a member of the Finland national under-20 football team and represented the team at the Valentin A. Granatkin Memorial Tournament. Hradecky was selected to Finland national under-21 football team for 2009 UEFA European Under-21 Championship but he had to withdraw due to a knee injury. He was the first choice keeper for Finland's under-21 side during the 2011 UEFA European U21 Championship qualifications.

Finland first team

In January 2010 Hradecky was called to the Finland national football team by Stuart Baxter to face South Korea in a friendly at Málaga, Spain. Hradecky was at the bench the whole match. He finally made his first team debut on 21 May 2010, when he replaced Jukka Lehtovaara for the second half in a 2–0 away loss against Estonia. He played his first UEFA European Championship qualification game on 3 June 2011 when Mixu Paatelainen chose him to the starting line up against San Marino in Serravalle. During autumn of 2011 he established himself as a regular in the Finland national team and appeared in the UEFA European Championship qualification matches against Moldova, Netherlands and Sweden.

Hradecky appeared in three friendly matches during Finland's preparation for 2014 FIFA World Cup qualification. He was chosen to starting line up in the first qualification match against France, but remained as a substitute for the rest of the campaign as Niki Mäenpää established himself as the number one choice.

Hradecky was called up for the UEFA Euro 2020 pre-tournament friendly match against Sweden on 29 May 2021. He played in all three international games at the UEFA Euro 2020 tournament. Finland was placed 3rd in Group B following a 2–0 defeat to Belgium on 21 June 2021. They were subsequently knocked out of the tournament. Hradecky was awarded as the tournament's  best goalkeeper of the group stage.

Personal life
Hradecky was born in the  area of Bratislava. He speaks Slovak and has a Slovak passport. That winter, the family settled in Runosmäki. His brothers Tomas and Matej are also professional footballers.

Career statistics

Club

International

Honours

Club
Esbjerg fB
Danish Cup: 2012–13
Danish 1st Division: 2011–12

Eintracht Frankfurt
DFB-Pokal: 2017–18

International
Finland
Baltic Cup:  runner-up: 2012

Individual
Football Association of Finland Promising Player of the Year: 2007
Best Goalkeeper Award at International Karel Stegeman U-19 Youth Tournament: 2008
Finland national under-21 football team Goalkeeper of the Year: 2010
Finland national under-21 football team Player of the Year: 2010
Danish Superliga Goalkeeper of the Year: 2013
Danish Superliga Best Player of the Spring Season: 2013
Esbjerg fB Best Player of the Season: 2013
Finnish Sports Journalists Footballer of the Year: 2016, 2017, 2018, 2020
Finnish Sports Personality of the Year: 2020
Bundesliga Team of the Season: 2017–18

Notes

References

External links

 Bayer Leverkusen official profile 
 Lukáš Hrádecký – SPL competition record
 
 
 
 
 
 

1989 births
Living people
Footballers from Bratislava
Association football goalkeepers
Finnish footballers
Finland international footballers
Finland under-21 international footballers
Slovak footballers
Turun Palloseura footballers
Åbo IFK players
Esbjerg fB players
Brøndby IF players
Eintracht Frankfurt players
Bayer 04 Leverkusen players
Danish Superliga players
Bundesliga players
UEFA Euro 2020 players
Finnish expatriate footballers
Slovak expatriate footballers
Expatriate men's footballers in Denmark
Expatriate footballers in Germany
Finnish people of Slovak descent
Finland youth international footballers